Billie Leigh Shepherd (née Faiers; born 15 January 1990) is an English television personality, known for her appearances on the ITVBe reality series The Only Way Is Essex from 2010 to 2016 and Sam & Billie: The Mummy Diaries from 2016 to 2021.

Career
In 2010, Shepherd began appearing in the ITV2 (now ITVBe) series The Only Way Is Essex. She made a brief appearance in the first series before becoming a regular cast member in series 2. Shepherd departed the show during the eighteenth series in 2016. Following her departure from The Only Way Is Essex, she began appearing in Sam Faiers: The Mummy Diaries (later renamed Sam & Billie: The Mummy Diaries in series 3) which documents Shepherd and her sister Sam bringing up their children. In October 2020, it was announced that Shepherd would be competing in the thirteenth series of the ITV competition programme Dancing on Ice. She was paired with Mark Hanretty. Shepherd withdrew from the competition on 6 February 2021 after suffering a head injury in training.

Shepherd's work includes advertising products on social media as an influencer. In May 2022 she was added to the UK's Advertising Standards Agency list of "non-compliant social media influencers" for improperly advertising products without adding requisite "ad" tags or labels to the adverts.

Filmography

References

External links
 

1990 births
English television personalities
Living people
Television personalities from Essex